Sanguela is a village and seat (chef-lieu) of the commune of Goudie Sougouna in the Cercle of Koutiala in the Sikasso Region of southern Mali. The village is 57 km southeast of Koutiala.

References

Populated places in Sikasso Region